Iulius Town Timișoara (until 2019 Openville Timișoara) is the name of a mixed-use development, edge city and shopping mall located in Timișoara, Romania. Owned by the –Atterbury Europe consortium, the project was conceived from the beginning to integrate Iulius Mall, now completed with office, retail and entertainment functions. The mixed project includes, in addition to the shopping area, a park, event rooms, offices, a health center, a cinema and over 4,000 parking spaces. Over 442 million euros were invested in the first phase of the project, partially inaugurated in August 2019, being one of the largest infusions of private capital in the real estate sector ever made in Romania. The estimated annual traffic for Iulius Town is over 20 million visitors.

Iulius Mall 

Iulius Mall Timișoara, the second mall within the Iulius national network, was inaugurated on 20 October 2005, following an initial investment of 45 million euros. It was developed on a site that hosted antennas mounted in the 1940s and that remained undervalued in the early 2000s.  was founded in 1991 by Iulian Dascălu, and the company currently owns three other malls in Iași, Suceava and Cluj-Napoca. At the time of its inauguration, Iulius Mall Timișoara was the first mall in western Romania.

In 2005, Iulius Mall Timișoara had a gross leasable area of 31,000 m2, which was then expanded to 73,000 m2 in 2009 and over 120,000 m2 in 2019. The mall has: 4,070 parking spaces, 450 stores, including a 11,500-square-meter Auchan hypermarket, a 12-screen Cinema City cinema, a 2,500-seat food court, full-service restaurants, bars and cafés, a semi-Olympic swimming pool and largest fitness club in Romania (over 3,400 m2), a climbing wall and ice rink (during the winter season), a bowling and billiard hall, a casino, indoor playgrounds and play areas, banks, police offices (vehicle registration and passport services) and a post office.

After the extensions, it is the largest mall outside Bucharest and the third largest in Romania, after AFI Cotroceni and Băneasa Shopping City.

Iulius Gardens 
Iulius Gardens have an area of 5.5 ha, being the largest suspended park in Romania. The park involved an investment of 8.7 million euros and was carried out by a team of specialists from Italy, Germany and Romania. Arranged above the underground car park in the complex, the green space integrates 10,000 shrubs and 1,400 large trees. Iulius Gardens also include an 800-square-meter lake, a multi-storey Venetian carousel for children, a gazebo, promenades and plazas for outdoor events and fairs.

United Business Center 

Iulius Town includes in the first stage of development over 100,000 m2 of Class A office space in four buildings, employing about 13,000 people. The first three buildings are operational, with tenants including multinational IT, automotive and customer support companies. The fourth office building, under construction, will be the tallest building in Romania. United Business Center 0 will include 52,000 m2 of office space, a 3,000-square-meter medical hub, restaurants, shops and a conference center.

The fourth office building in the Iulius Town Timișoara complex is operational and consolidates the regional business pole from the mixed-use urban regeneration project with a total leasable area of 80,000 m2 and a community of over 40 multinational companies from three continents . United Business Center 0 has a leasable area of ​​over 30,000m2, occupied by the offices of 15 companies in the fields of IT & Outsourcing, automotive and services.

Notes

See also 
 Palas Iași
 Iulius Mall Cluj
 Iulius Mall Iași
 Iulius Mall Suceava

References 

Shopping malls in Timișoara
Edge cities in Romania